Yang Seung-Won (born 15 July 1985) is a South Korean football defender currently playing for Yongin City in the National League, the third tier of South Korean football.

Club career
Yang joined Daegu FC from Daegu University for the 2008 season, and was initially handed the No. 30 jersey.  After making only intermittent appearances (but scoring one goal) for the senior side in 2008, he was firmly established in the side for the 2009 season, playing 23 matches in all competitions.  He remains with the club for the 2010 season.

He was summarily indicted in the 2011 South Korean football betting scandal and the K League suspended him for 2 years. In 2013, the K League reduced his disciplinary punishment and he returned to Daegu.

He joined National League side Yongin City ahead of the 2014 season.

Club career statistics

External links

1985 births
Living people
Association football defenders
South Korean footballers
Daegu FC players
K League 1 players